Bystra may refer to:

Bystra, Gorlice County in Lesser Poland Voivodeship (south Poland)
Bystra, Sucha County in Lesser Poland Voivodeship (south Poland)
Bystra, Bielsko County in Silesian Voivodeship (south Poland)
Bystra, Żywiec County in Silesian Voivodeship (south Poland)
Bystra, Pomeranian Voivodeship (north Poland)
Bystra, West Pomeranian Voivodeship (north-west Poland)
Bystrá (Pelhřimov District) in the Vysočina Region of the Czech Republic
Bystrá, Brezno District in the Banská Bystrica Region of Slovakia
Bystrá, Stropkov District in the Prešov Region of Slovakia
Bystrá (mountain), in the Western Tatras, Slovakia
Bystré (Svitavy District), in the Czech Republic, Svitavy District (Pardubice Region); German name Bistrau